Chris & Kem were a British musical duo who charted at number fifteen on the UK Singles Chart in 2017 with their song "Little Bit Leave It". They were composed of friends Kem Cetinay and Chris Hughes, who met on the third series of Love Island in 2017.

Discography

Single

References

English musical duos
English hip hop groups
Hip hop duos
Grime music groups